Darling of the Dragoons (German: Dragonerliebchen) is a 1928 German silent comedy film directed by Rudolf Walther-Fein and starring Maria Paudler, Harry Liedtke and Fritz Kampers.

Cast
 Maria Paudler as Gisi  
 Harry Liedtke as Oberleutnant Seppl Sterz  
 Fritz Kampers as Pfiff, sein Bursche  
 Hanni Weisse as Fräulein Pichalec  
 Hans Junkermann as Oberst Ritter von Weidlingen  
 Margarete Kupfer as Die Wirtin

References

Bibliography
 Grange, William. Cultural Chronicle of the Weimar Republic. Scarecrow Press, 2008.

External links

1928 films
Films of the Weimar Republic
German silent feature films
Films directed by Rudolf Walther-Fein
1928 comedy films
German comedy films
German black-and-white films
Silent comedy films
1920s German films
1920s German-language films